Highway 9, the Agassiz-Rosedale Highway, is a north-south route in the eastern part of the Fraser Valley. It acts as the last connection between the Trans Canada Highway (Highway 1) and the Lougheed Highway (Highway 7) eastbound before Hope, and is the main access to the resort village of Harrison Hot Springs. The highway first opened in 1953, originally going between Yale Road in Rosedale and Highway 7, with a ferry across the Fraser River. A bridge for Highway 9 across the Fraser opened in 1956. When the section of Highway 1 east of Chilliwack opened in 1961, Highway 9 was extended south to a junction with the new Highway 1 alignment, which replaced Yale Road as the main route between Chilliwack and Hope.

Route details
In the south, the Highway starts at an interchange on Highway 1 between Rosedale and the Bridal Falls area.

Major intersections 
From south to north. The entire route is in the Fraser Valley Regional District.

References

External links

 Official Numbered Routes in British Columbia

009
Transport in Chilliwack